Fayette is a city in Jefferson County, Mississippi, United States. The population was 1,614 at the 2010 census. It is the county seat of Jefferson County.

Geography
Fayette is located at  (31.711144, -91.062246).

History
In 1879, the Jesse James gang, based in Missouri, raided southwest Mississippi, robbing a store each in Washington and Fayette. The outlaws absconded with $2,000 cash in the second robbery and took shelter in abandoned cabins on the Kemp Plantation south of St. Joseph, Louisiana. A posse attacked and killed two of the outlaws but failed to capture the entire gang. Jesse James and most of his gang succeeded in returning to Missouri. He was killed three years later in 1882 at his home in St. Joseph, Missouri.

In 1890, the white Democrat-controlled Mississippi legislature passed a new constitution, which effectively disenfranchised most black people in the state, crippling their integration into society and the Republican Party of the time. 

After Congressional passage of the Voting Rights Act of 1965, black people began to register and vote again. Charles Evers was elected as mayor in 1969 by the people of Fayette; he was the first African-American mayor elected in post-Reconstruction Mississippi. He beat the white incumbent R.G. Allen, 386 votes –225 votes. Evers was an activist and the brother of slain civil rights leader Medgar Evers, head of the Mississippi chapter of the NAACP when he was assassinated in 1963.

Demographics

2020 census

As of the 2020 United States Census, there were 1,445 people, 510 households, and 291 families residing in the city.

2000 census
As of the census of 2000, there were 2,242 people, 775 households, and 543 families residing in the city. The population density was 1,903.3 people per square mile (733.6/km2). There were 843 housing units at an average density of 715.6 per square mile (275.8/km2). The racial makeup of the city was 97.37% African American, 1.92% White, 0.09% Native American, 0.22% Asian, and 0.40% from two or more races. Hispanic or Latino of any race were 0.62% of the population.

There were 775 households, out of which 39.6% had children under the age of 18 living with them, 24.4% were married couples living together, 40.3% had a female householder with no husband present, and 29.9% were non-families. 27.2% of all households were made up of individuals, and 9.8% had someone living alone who was 65 years of age or older. The average household size was 2.82 and the average family size was 3.46.

In the city, the population was spread out, with 34.2% under the age of 18, 12.6% from 18 to 24, 25.6% from 25 to 44, 17.2% from 45 to 64, and 10.4% who were 65 years of age or older. The median age was 28 years. For every 100 females, there were 75.6 males. For every 100 females age 18 and over, there were 69.1 males.

The median income for a household in the city was $13,564, and the median income for a family was $16,875. Males had a median income of $20,500 versus $17,011 for females. The per capita income for the city was $8,101. About 44.4% of families and 48.2% of the population were below the poverty line, including 58.8% of those under age 18 and 38.2% of those age 65 or over.

Education
The City of Fayette is served by the Jefferson County School District.

Notable people
 Albert Clark, Negro league outfielder
 Charles Evers - first post-Reconstruction African-American mayor in Mississippi
 Thomas M. Green Jr., member of the U.S. House of Representatives from 1802 to 1803. Built Springfield Plantation in Fayette.
 Dudley Guice Jr., former National Football League wide receiver
 Alvin Hall, former defensive back for the Los Angeles Rams
 Richard H. Truly - Eighth NASA administrator
 Thomas M. Wade -  Louisiana politician and educator, was born in 1860 at Point Prospect Plantation near Fayette.

References

External links
 Official webpage for the Town of Fayette
 Official webpage for Jefferson County

Cities in Mississippi
Cities in Jefferson County, Mississippi
County seats in Mississippi